Chiesa di Santa Giusta a Bazzano (Italian for Church of Santa Giusta in Bazzano)  is a  Romanesque church in Bazzano, frazione of L'Aquila (Abruzzo).

History 
Evidence suggests the crypt and an earlier church derives from the 9th century. But the present church appears to have been commissioned in a sober Romanesque style by the Benedictines between the late 12th and early 13th centuries.

Architecture

References

External links

Giusta Bazzano
9th-century churches in Italy
13th-century Roman Catholic church buildings in Italy
Romanesque architecture in Abruzzo